San Remigio di Firenze is a church in Florence, Italy.

The church was founded around the year 1000.  It is dedicated to Saint Remigius.  In the 13th century, the church was reconstructed to feature a triangle-shaped facade with hanging arches along the roof line.  The interior still reflects the original Gothic architecture with ogive arches and octagonal columns along the three aisles.

Notes

References 

I Luoghi della Fede by Regione Toscana (in English and Italian)

11th-century Roman Catholic church buildings in Italy
13th-century Roman Catholic church buildings in Italy
Remigio
1000s establishments in Europe
11th-century establishments in Italy